Debipur may refer to:
 Debipur, Bangladesh
 Debipur, India
 Debipur, West Bengal
 Debipur, Murshidabad

See also
 Devipur (disambiguation)